The 2018 Pulitzer Prizes were awarded by the Pulitzer Prize Board for work during the 2017 calendar year. Prize winners and nominated finalists were announced by Dana Canedy at 3:00 p.m. EST on April 16, 2018.

The New York Times won the most awards of any newspaper, with three, bringing its total to one hundred and twenty-five Pulitzer Prizes. The Washington Post won Investigative Reporting and National Reporting, the latter of which was shared with The New York Times. The New York Times and The New Yorker won the prize in public service, bringing their totals to 125 and five, respectively. The Press-Democrat won Breaking News Reporting, bringing its total to two prizes. The staff of The Arizona Republic and USA Today won for explanatory reporting; The Cincinnati Enquirer for local reporting about the heroin epidemic; and Reuters won international reporting.

In letters, drama, and music, Kendrick Lamar's Damn won the music prize, the first non-classical and non-jazz work to win the award.

Journalism

Letters, Drama, and Music

Special citations

No special citations were awarded this year.

References 

2018
Columbia University Graduate School of Journalism
2018 literary awards
2018 awards in the United States
2018 music awards
April 2018 events in the United States